The Leeds Country Way is a circular long-distance footpath of 62 miles (99 km) around Leeds, West Yorkshire, England.  It is never more than 7 miles (11 km) from City Square, Leeds, but is mainly rural with extensive views in the outlying areas of the Leeds metropolitan district.  It follows public Rights of Way including footpaths, bridleways and minor lanes, with a few short sections along roads.

History

A route was first devised by Fred Andrews of the Ramblers Association, and then developed by West Yorkshire County Council in the early 1980s.  This council was abolished in 1986, and the path is now under the care of the Countryside section of Leeds City Council.  The Leeds Country Way was realigned in 2006, using a route devised by Bob Brewster, to bring it entirely within the boundary of the Leeds metropolitan district (previously it crossed the boundary into Wakefield), and the path was officially relaunched on 26 September 2006 with a revised set of map leaflets (see external links) and improved waymarking.

Route

The path is waymarked in both directions and can be started at any point, but is described here clockwise from the A660 road at Golden Acre Park, divided into parts and sections which  correspond with the official map leaflets.

Part 1: Golden Acre  to Barwick-in-Elmet 

Section 1:  The path crosses Golden Acre Park and passes the Yorkshire Wildlife Trust's Adel Dam Nature Reserve, following the route of the Meanwood Valley Trail.  It coincides briefly with the Leeds link to the Dales Way north of Eccup Reservoir, before crossing the Ebor Way and entering the Harewood Estate.  Here there is a glimpse of what looks like a small village, not marked on any map, but which is actually the set for the TV series Emmerdale. Walkers may also see red kites which have been successfully reintroduced in this area.

Section 2: After crossing the A61, the way passes north of Wike and reaches the village of Bardsey with its Anglo-Saxon church tower and the Bingley Arms public house, which claims to be the oldest in England.   The way turns south, crossing the A58, to Scarcroft.

Section 3: The path continues through Thorner, crossing the A64 before entering Barwick-in-Elmet with England's tallest maypole, a Norman motte and an Iron Age fort.

Part 2: Barwick-in-Elmet to Carlton 

Section 1: From Barwick the way passes the southern corner of Scholes, then crosses the M1 motorway and enters Garforth.

Section 2: It leaves Garforth along the disused Garforth-Kippax railway line (part of the North Eastern Railway and earlier the Leeds, Castleford and Pontefract Junction Railway), then approaches Swillington and passes Little Preston Old Hall. It skirts St Aidan's Country Park, and crosses the River Aire at Swillington Bridge.  The path follows the river downstream, past the marina at Fleet Bridge.

Section 3: The path continues along the river, here forming the Aire and Calder Navigation, to Mickletown, and then turns south to Methley.  It swings eastward, crosses the A642 and continues to Carlton, heart of the West Yorkshire Rhubarb Triangle.

Part 3: Carlton to Cockersdale 

Section 1: From Carlton the path crosses fields before briefly joining the A61 and recrossing the M1 south of Robin Hood.  It turns south across the M62, follows the valley of Dolphin Beck, and reaches East Ardsley on the A650.

Section 2: From here the path skirts south of West Ardsley, and reaches Woodkirk with its historic church, on the A653.  It passes the ruins of Howley Hall (built 1590 for Sir John Savile) before dropping down to reach Scotchman Lane.

Section 3: A track through Birkby Brow Wood, just inside the Leeds-Kirklees boundary, leads to the A643, which is followed to recross the M62.  The path's longest section of road walking follows the A650 through Gildersome, then a series of field paths leads to Cockersdale, on the A58 near Tong.

Part 4: Cockersdale to Golden Acre 

Section 1: The path follows the valley of Cockersdale, and then goes along Tong Beck, below Fulneck Moravian Settlement, skirting the south of Pudsey. At this point Tong Beck forms the Leeds-Bradford boundary.  The path crosses the Leeds to Bradford railway and meets the busy A647 at Thornbury.

Section 2: Passing playing fields and old quarries, the path crosses the Woodhall Hills and follows Fagley Beck to cross the Leeds and Liverpool Canal and the River Aire at Apperley Bridge, then follows the river past Woodhouse Grove School before climbing up to meet the A65 south of Rawdon.

Section 3: From here the path skirts Horsforth, follows for a time the southern boundary of Leeds Bradford International Airport, and goes round the northern edge of Cookridge, before crossing Breary Marsh Local Nature Reserve to return to Golden Acre Park.

Practical aspects
As the route is circular it can be started at any point, but the description in the official leaflets starts and finishes at Golden Acre Park, going clockwise.  These divide it into four parts each split into three sections, but walkers can choose to divide it in various ways as there are many bus routes and several railway stations (Woodlesford, Garforth, New Pudsey and Horsforth) on or near the path. West Yorkshire Metro provides information about bus routes serving the path and train services in the area.

The Ordnance Survey maps covering the route are: 
 Landranger 1:50,000 sheet 104 (Leeds: covers almost the whole route) and 105 (York: needed for a short distance near Garforth)
 Explorer 1:25,000 sheets 289 (Leeds: Golden Acre Park clockwise to Scotchman Lane) and 288 (Bradford: Scotchman Lane clockwise to Golden Acre Park).

The route is waymarked with an owl symbol, taken from the Leeds coat of arms.

The original route of the path is used for an annual trail running relay race organised by Kippax Harriers.  Teams of twelve, with two runners taking each of six sections, complete the route in about seven hours.

References

External links

 Leeds City Council information about path, with downloadable map  leaflets (half size) and information about obtaining hardcopy leaflets.

Each downloadable map/guide covers approx 15 miles and is split into 3 sections of approx 5 miles each. Each map/guide prints out to two A4 sheets of paper.
  Leeds City Council PDF file of guide to Part 1 of the route
  Leeds City Council PDF file of guide to Part 2 of the route
  Leeds City Council PDF file of guide to Part 3 of the route
  Leeds City Council PDF file of guide to Part 4 of the route
 Kippax Harriers website with very detailed description of original route
 Long Distance Walkers Association record for the path

Long-distance footpaths in England
Tourist attractions in Leeds
Footpaths in West Yorkshire